Danielle Claar is a marine scientist whose research has covered the effect of the 2015/2016 El Niño event on coral symbionts and parasites.

Life
She studied for an undergraduate degree at the University of Hawaii at Hilo, before completing a PhD at the University of Victoria in Canada. After her PhD Claar joined the Wood Lab at the University of Washington in Seattle as a NOAA Climate and Global Change Postdoctoral Fellow. 

Claar studied an undergraduate degree in Marine Science at the University of Hawaii in Hilo. In 2011, during her undergraduate studies, Claar undertook a NOAA Hollings Undergraduate Scholarship at Kasitsna Bay Laboratory in Alaska. She then went on to complete PhD studies from 2013-2018 at University of Victoria in Canada concerned coral symbiosis during the 2015/2016 El Niño event. Her thesis "Coral Symbioses Under Stress: Spatial and Temporal Dynamics of Coral-Symbiodinium Interactions" earned her the Canadian Governor General's gold medal for academic excellence. During her doctoral study Claar made use of her training as a scientific diver to complete field work on the island of Kiritimati in the Pacific Ocean.

Work
After her PhD, Claar took up a NOAA Climate and Global Change (C&GC) Postdoctoral Fellowship to study "Large-scale climatic drivers of parasitism in coral reef fishes" at the University of Washington, Seattle.

See also 

 2014–16 El Niño event
 Coral in Climate Research
 Effect of Climate Change on coral
 Coral bleaching

References 

University of Victoria alumni
University of Hawaiʻi at Hilo alumni
Women climatologists
Year of birth missing (living people)
Living people